R v Sussex Justices, ex parte McCarthy ([1924] 1 KB 256, [1923] All ER Rep 233) is a leading English case on the impartiality and recusal of judges.  It is famous as a legal precedent in establishing the principle that the mere appearance of bias is sufficient to overturn a judicial decision. It also brought into common parlance the oft-quoted aphorism "Not only must Justice be done; it must also be seen to be done."

Facts
In 1923 McCarthy, a motorcyclist, was involved in a road accident which resulted in his prosecution before a magistrates' court for dangerous driving. Unknown to the defendant and his solicitor, the clerk to the justices was a member of the firm of solicitors acting in a civil claim against the defendant arising out of the accident that had given rise to the prosecution. The clerk retired with the justices, who returned to convict the defendant.

On learning of the clerk's provenance, the defendant applied to have the conviction quashed. The justices swore affidavits stating that they had reached their decision to convict the defendant without consulting their clerk.

Judgment
The appeal was essentially one of judicial review and was heard at the King's Bench division by Lord Chief Justice Hewart. In a landmark and far-reaching judgement, Lord Hewart CJ said:

The ruling is derived from the principle of natural justice and has been followed throughout the world in countries that use the English legal system. It was applied in the Augusto Pinochet case, where the House of Lords overturned its own decision on the grounds of Lord Hoffman's conflict of interest. It has also been applied in a wide array of diverse situations, including immigration cases, professional disciplinary cases, and domestic tribunals, such as within members' clubs.

See also
R v Bow Street Metropolitan Stipendiary Magistrate Ex parte Pinochet Ugarte (No.2)

References

External links
 text of the judgement at Bailii
 In Re Pinochet
 "Knowledge of the World and the Act of Judging", Robin Jacob

1924 in case law
1924 in British law
High Court of Justice cases
Vehicle law
Conflict of interest mitigation